El Mar No Cesa is the debut album of Spanish rock band Héroes del Silencio, released on October 31 1988. It went platinum quickly, and made them one of the greatest rock bands of Spain.

Track listing

LP edition 
"Mar Adentro" (Into the Sea) - 4:00
"Hace Tiempo" (It's Been a While) - 4:31
"Fuente Esperanza" (Hope Fountain) - 4:46
"No Más Lágrimas" (No More Tears) - 3:30
"La Lluvia Gris" (The Grey Rain) - 4:20
"Flor Venenosa" (Poisonous Flower) - 4:10
"Agosto" (August) - 4:22
"El Estanque" (The Pond) - 4:14
"La Isla de Las Iguanas" (Island of the Iguanas) - 3:18
"... 16" - 3:52
"Héroe de Leyenda" (Hero of Legend) - 4:07

CD edition 
"Mar Adentro" - 4:00
"Hace Tiempo" - 4:31
"Fuente Esperanza" - 4:46
"No Más Lagrimas" - 3:30
"Olvidado" (Forgotten) - 4:26
"La Lluvia Gris" - 4:20
"Flor Venenosa" - 4:10
"Agosto" - 4:22
"El Estanque" - 4:14
"La Visión de Vuestras Almas" (Vision of Thy Souls) - 4:10
"La Isla de Las Iguanas" - 3:18
"... 16" - 3:52
"Héroe de Leyenda" - 4:07

References

External links
 Héroes Del Silencio official Site
 http://www.todomusica.org/heroes_del_silencio/

Héroes del Silencio albums
1988 debut albums
EMI Records albums
Spanish-language albums